McDowall may refer to:

McDowall (surname)
 Clan Macdowall, a lowland Scottish clan
McDowall, Queensland, Australia
McDowall State School, a state primary school in Brisbane, Australia

See also
 McDowell (disambiguation)